The Blue Gum Swamp is a  swamp located in Blue Mountains National Park in the lower Grose Valley of the Blue Mountains,  in New South Wales west of Sydney, southeastern Australia.

Natural history

In the ancient past, the valley floor was blocked. This caused a residual alluvial deposit, which resulted in relatively deep and fertile soils. The tall mountain blue gum (Eucalyptus deanei) trees in the gully may reach  in height. On the ridges the dry stunted vegetation is typical of much of the sandstone based areas near Sydney.

The area is well regarded by bird watchers. Noteworthy species here include the powerful owl, lyrebird, sooty owl, and the tiny Weebill.

Mammal species are mostly nocturnal and not often seen. However, they include the yellow-bellied glider, sugar glider, greater glider, swamp wallaby, common ringtail possum, common brush tail possum, grey-headed flying fox, bandicoots and microbats.

See also

 Protected areas of New South Wales

References

External links
Blue Gum Swamp, Winmalee
eBird Australia webpage for Blue Gum Swamp, Winmalee

Forests of New South Wales
Parks and reserves of the Blue Mountains (New South Wales)